S105 may refer to:
 HMS Spartan (S105), a 1978 nuclear-powered fleet submarine of the Royal Navy Swiftsure class
 a Saviem bus model